The New York Yacht Club (NYYC) is a private social club and yacht club based in New York City and Newport, Rhode Island. It was founded in 1844 by nine prominent sportsmen. The members have contributed to the sport of yachting and yacht design.  As of 2001, the organization was reported to have about 3,000 members. Membership in the club is by invitation only. Its officers include a  commodore, vice-commodore, rear-commodore, secretary and treasurer.

The club is headquartered at the New York Yacht Club Building in New York City. The America's Cup trophy was won by members in 1851 and held by the NYYC until 1983. The NYYC successfully defended the trophy twenty-four times in a row before being defeated by the Royal Perth Yacht Club, represented by the yacht Australia II. The NYYC's reign was the longest winning streak as measured by years in the history of all sports.

The NYYC entered 2021 and 2024 America's Cup competition under the syndicate name American Magic.

Clubhouses

In 1845, the club's first clubhouse was established—a modest, Gothic-revival building in Hoboken, New Jersey, designed by architect Alexander Jackson Davis, on land donated by Commodore John Cox Stevens. After outgrowing its cramped quarters, the club moved to the McFarlane–Bredt House in Staten Island, then to Madison Avenue in Manhattan. The Hoboken clubhouse itself was physically relocated to Glen Cove, New York, then to Mystic, Connecticut.

Its primary clubhouse is the New York Yacht Club Building, a six-storied Beaux-Arts landmark with a nautical-themed limestone facade, at 37 West 44th Street in Midtown Manhattan.  Opened in 1901, the clubhouse was designed by Warren and Wetmore (1898), who later helped design Grand Central Terminal. The centerpiece of the clubhouse is the "Model Room", which contains a notable collection of full and half hull models including a scale model history of all New York Yacht Club America's Cup challenges.  It was designated a National Historic Landmark in 1987.

In addition to its Manhattan headquarters, located inland, the club maintains "Harbour Court", a clubhouse opened in 1988 on the water in Newport.

History

The New York Yacht Club was founded on July 30, 1844, by nine gentlemen. John Cox Stevens, the leader of this group, and a prominent citizen of New York with a passion for sports, was elected commodore.  John Clarkson Jay of Rye, one of the nine founders, was a grandson of Founding Father John Jay and served as the first Secretary of the board. George L. Schuyler and Hamilton Wilkes were also NYYC founders who, together with Stevens and two others, created the syndicate that built and raced the great schooner-yacht, America.  Wilkes served as the club's first vice-commodore.  Schuyler played a key role in the founding of the America's Cup regatta, and served as its unofficial consultant until his death in 1890.

In 1845, the club's burgee was designed. The waters off Newport have been a key sailing venue for the NYYC since the beginning of its history.  Indeed, the day the club was founded in 1844, its members resolved to sail from the Battery to Newport.  Two days later, they did, with several stops on the way, and trials of speed.

During the first decades of the club's history, racing for prize money was the objective among most members. In 1851, a syndicate of NYYC enthusiasts built and raced America, capturing the "One Hundred Sovereign Cup" at the annual regatta of the Royal Yacht Squadron.  On July 8, 1857, the coveted trophy was donated to the NYYC, to serve as a challenge cup for sportsmanlike competition between nations. The "America's Cup Race", named for its first winner, played a central role in the history of the club until this day.

In 1865, the Club was incorporated, adopting the Latin motto: "Nos agimur tumidis velis" – "We go with swelling sails" (adapted from the verse of the famous Roman poet Horace, "Non agimur tumidis uelis", "We do not go with swelling sails", in Epistles, 2, 2, 201).  During this time, membership transitioned from the "old guard" to a new generation of yachtsmen, who built large schooner yachts captained by professionals.  Marking this evolution was the 1866 resignation of Commodore Edwin Augustus Stevens, brother of founder John Cox Stevens and member of the America syndicate.

The year 1866 is remembered in club annals for the legendary "Transatlantic Race".  In December, the NYYC schooners Henrietta, Fleetwing, and Vesta raced from Sandy Hook to The Needles, Isle of Wight for a $90,000 winner-take-all prize.  The Henrietta, owned by 21-year-old James Gordon Bennett Jr., and skippered by Captain Samuel S. Samuels, won the race in 13 days, 21 hours and 55 minutes.  Bennett would be elected commodore in 1871.

On August 8, 1870, the schooner Magic represented the New York Yacht Club in the international 1870 America's Cup competition in the New York Harbor and was won by Franklin Osgood's American yacht Magic. She beat 17 competitors, including the English yacht Cambria and the yachts Dauntless, Idler, Fleetwing, Phantom, America and others.

In 1876, the Mohawk, a large centerboard schooner, capsized due to its sheets being "made fast" (fastened securely) when a freak squall struck.  Vice-Commodore William T. Garner, his wife and crew died in the accident.   It is believed that this tragedy led to the extinction of the great centerboard schooner yachts. The Mohawk was later sold to the U.S. Navy and recommissioned as the USS Eagre.

In 1895, Richard H. Barker composed 'The yacht club march: march and two-step: for piano' in honor of the New York Yacht Club.

In 1994, as part of the Club's 150th anniversary celebrations, Melissa H. Harrington wrote the book The New York Yacht Club, 1844–1994.

New York Yacht Club Stations c. 1894

By 1894, the New York Yacht Club had a number of Clubhouses: Station 1 in Bay Ridge; 2 in New York NY; 3 in Whitestone NY; 4 in New London, Connecticut; 5 in Shelter Island, New York; 6 in Newport RI; 7 in Vineyard Haven and at Rendezvous Glen Cove. In 1868, the club bought a big mansion used as Station 2 at Rosebank, Staten Island. This building still stands and is known as the McFarlane–Bredt House.

Former Commodore J. P. Morgan was present at a board meeting on 27 October 1898 to discuss the construction of a new clubhouse.   Morgan offered to acquire a  plot on 44th Street in midtown Manhattan  if the NYYC raised its annual membership dues from $25 to $50 and if the new clubhouse occupied the entire site. The board accepted his offer, and Morgan bought the lots the next day for $148,000 and donated to the Club.

Members hosted an informal housewarming party on 29 January 1901 and gave Morgan a trophy in gratitude of his purchase of the site.

Racing and the America's Cup

Following the disastrous Bay of Quinte America's Cup challenge in 1881, the Club's committee voted a new rule to govern its races:

The America's Cup challenges of 1885, 1886 and 1887 used this rule with an  waterline length limit. In 1887, the NYYC adopted the Seawanhaka Corinthian Yacht Club's rating rule, which handicapped length comparatively less. Then, in 1903, the NYYC changed its rating system to the "Herreshoff Rule", devised by the yacht designer, Nathanael Herreshoff.  Later renamed the "Universal Rule", it would be adopted by the majority of leading American yacht clubs. The rule governed yacht design for almost forty years.

The America's Cup was held for 132 years, from 1851 until Australia II defeated Dennis Conner's Liberty off Newport, Rhode Island in 1983. This record remains the longest winning streak in sports history.

Since the loss of the Cup the NYYC has been forced to reinvent itself and the Club has become involved in team racing, dinghy racing, youth sailing, and international regattas. In 2002 the Club hosted the Intercollegiate Sailing Association Sloop North American Championships. In 2006 the Club hosted the Blind Sailing World Championships.

The NYYC entered 2021 America's Cup represented by the American Magic team, led by Terry Hutchinson and Bella Mente Quantum Racing Association. In May 2018, it was announced that Dean Barker will helm the boat. 
"American Magic" references the first Cup winner, the yacht America, and the first defender, the yacht Magic.

Regattas

 2005 Rolex Transatlantic Challenge
 "New York Yacht Club Cruise", an annual series of races held in July or August
 "Annual Regatta", started in 1846
 "Queen's Cup Trophy"
 "12-metre Worlds"
 "Una Cup"
 "Corsair Cup"
 "Astor Cups"
 "Solution Trophy"
 Invitational Cup

Notable members

 Winthrop W. Aldrich
 Brooke Astor
 John Jacob Astor, real estate mogul
 Vincent Astor
 George Fisher Baker
 August Belmont
 James Gordon Bennett Jr., newspaper publisher
 Michael Bloomberg, Mayor of New York City
 John Nicholas Brown II, philanthropist
 Frederick Gilbert Bourne
 William F. Buckley, author and commentator
 William A. Chanler, explorer, soldier and US Congressman
 Robert H. Conn, Assistant Secretary of the Navy
 Dennis Conner, racing yacht captain
 William P. Cronan, 19th Naval Governor of Guam
 Walter Cronkite, newscaster
 Chris Dodd, United States senator
 Pete DuPont, governor of Delaware
 Elbridge Thomas Gerry
 Jay Gould, railroad tycoon
 Alfred Walton Hinds, 17th Naval Governor of Guam
 Charles Oliver Iselin
 Charles O'Neal, politician
 Arthur Curtiss James
 Gary Jobson
 Edward Kennedy Jr., son of United States Senator
 Dennis Kozlowski (resigned)
 Herbert F. Leary, Vice admiral in the Navy
 Lewis Cass Ledyard
 John Lehman, Secretary of the Navy
 Bernard Madoff (resigned)
 Clarence Moore, businessman
 J. P. Morgan, financier
 J. P. Morgan Jr.
 Junius Spencer Morgan III
 Emil Mosbacher
 Robert Mosbacher
 Franklin Osgood (1826–1888), served three terms as Rear-Commodore; member of first America's Cup Committee (1869)
Frank F. Olney (1851–1903), 18th Mayor of Providence, Rhode Island
 Trenor Luther Park elected 1883, owned the Sultana
Jonas M. Platt, major general in the Marine Corps
David Rockefeller, banker
Franklin D. Roosevelt, 32nd President of the United States
Gary Roughead, 29th Chief of Naval Operations, US Navy
Elliott Fitch Shepard, lawyer and newspaper owner
Alfred P. Sloan
George J. Smith, U.S. Congressman and cigar manufacturer
John Cox Stevens
Olin Stephens, yacht designer
Ted Turner, media mogul
Cornelius Vanderbilt III, Army general
Harold Stirling Vanderbilt, railroad executive
Thomas Watson Jr.

See also
 List of American gentlemen's clubs
 New York 36, sailboat design for club member's racing

References

Further reading
New York Yacht Club by New York Yacht Club and Rarebooksclub.com (Mar 4 2012). 
 The History of Yachting, 1600–1815 by Arthur H. Clark; pub. under authority and direction of the New York Yacht Club (New York ; London : G.P. Putnam's Sons, 1904)

External links

 

 
1844 establishments in New York (state)
America's Cup yacht clubs
Clubs and societies in New York City
Gentlemen's clubs in New York City
Yacht clubs in the United States
Yachting in New York City